Sainte-Anne-de-la-Pocatière is a parish municipality in the Canadian province of Quebec, located in the Kamouraska Regional County Municipality.

Demographics 

Government 
 Mayor: Miles McCall
 Councillors: Dominique Bélanger, Luc Martin Deroy, Martine Hudon, Carole Lévesque, Alphée Pelletier, Philippe Roy

Notable people
 Marie-Claude Bourbonnais, glamour model

See also
 List of municipalities in Quebec

References

External links
 

Parish municipalities in Quebec
Incorporated places in Bas-Saint-Laurent